Charles Coffin may refer to:

Charles Coffin (writer) (1676–1749), French writer, educator and Jansenist
Charles A. Coffin (1844–1926), first President of General Electric corporation
Charles Carleton Coffin (1823–1896), author of several historic manuscripts
Charles D. Coffin (1805–1880), U.S. Representative from Ohio
Charles Edward Coffin (1841–1912), U.S. Congressman from Maryland
Charles L. Coffin, American inventor of arc welding process